The 15th NKP Salve Challenger Trophy was an Indian domestic cricket tournament that was held in Nagpur from 8 October to 11 October 2009. The series involved the domestic teams from India which were India Blue, India Red, and India Green. India Red defeated India Blue by 7 wickets in the final to become the champions of the tournament.

Squads

 Abhinav Mukund replaced Sachin Tendulkar in the India Blue squad, after the selectors gave Tendulkar rest due to the food poisoning he suffered during the Champions trophy.
 Subramaniam Badrinath who was originally picked for India Green squad, replaced Yuvraj Singh as the captain of India Red after Yuvraj Singh had to force himself out of the tournament due to injury while Ameya Shrikhande was named as replacement. 
 In India Green, Vikramjeet Malik replaced Irfan Pathan who had to also force himself out of the tournament due to an injury along with Yuvraj Singh. Saurabh Tiwary also replaced Manoj Tiwary in the squad, after Manoj Tiwary was called to represent Delhi Daredevils for the Champions League Twenty20.

Points Table

Matches

Group stage

Final

References

Indian domestic cricket competitions
2010 in Indian sport
2009 in Indian sport